Georgios Karageorgos (10 January 1915 – 1993) was a Greek sprinter. He competed in the men's 400 metres at the 1948 Summer Olympics.

References

1915 births
1993 deaths
Athletes (track and field) at the 1948 Summer Olympics
Greek male sprinters
Greek male middle-distance runners
Olympic athletes of Greece
Place of birth missing